The Afghanistan cricket team toured Ireland in August 2022 to play five Twenty20 International (T20I) matches.  Initially, the tour included a one-off Test match, but this was dropped from the fixtures when Cricket Ireland announced the schedule in March 2022. Cricket Ireland confirmed the dates and venues for the tour later the same month. The matches were used by both teams as preparation for the 2022 ICC Men's T20 World Cup.

Ireland won the series 3–2 after claiming a victory in a rain-affected final match. George Dockrell was named player of the series.

Squads

The Afghanistan Cricket Board (ACB) also named Qais Ahmad, Nijat Masood, Usman Ghani and Mujeeb Ur Rahman as reserve players for the series. Usman Ghani and Mujeeb Ur Rahman, who were only temporarily named as reserves, were later added to the main squad once they received clearance regarding their visas. Simi Singh was added to Ireland's squad after the third T20I, in place of Andy McBrine.

T20I series

1st T20I

2nd T20I

3rd T20I

4th T20I

5th T20I

References

External links
 Series home at ESPNcricinfo

2022 in Irish cricket
2022 in Afghan cricket
International cricket competitions in 2022
Afghan cricket tours of Ireland